Ma Yangyang (born 20 February 1998) is a Chinese footballer currently playing as a defender for Zibo Qisheng in China League Two.

Career statistics

Club
.

References

1998 births
Living people
Chinese footballers
Association football defenders
China League One players
Beijing Guoan F.C. players
Shaanxi Chang'an Athletic F.C. players
21st-century Chinese people